Sarah Woolley (born 1987) is a British trade union leader, the first ever woman to lead the Bakers, Food and Allied Workers' Union (BFAWU).

Woolley joined BFAWU while working part-time at a Bakers Oven shop.  She became full-time, and later a shop manager, while Bakers Oven became part of Greggs.  Following the merger, Woolley met the branch secretary and became active, firstly as a shop steward, and was later elected onto its national executive committee, then became a full time official. She also sits on the executive and finance and general purposes committee of the General Federation of Trade Unions.

Woolley was elected as leader of the union in 2019, and took up the post on 1 May 2020.

In the 2020 Labour Party leadership election, Woolley supported Rebecca Long-Bailey.

References

1987 births
Living people
General secretaries of British trade unions